Bérubé is a Norman surname and a French-Canadian surname, sometimes anglicized as Berube:

 Allan Bérubé (1946–2007), gay American historian, researcher and activist
 Carla Berube, American college basketball coach
 Connie Berube Binsfeld (born  1924), Republican politician from Michigan
 Craig Berube (born 1965–), Canadian ice hockey player
 David M. Berube (born  1953), American science communication scholar and researcher
Georgette Berube (1927–2005), American politician
 Jacquelynn Berube (born 1971), American weightlifter
 Jean-François Bérubé (born 1991), Canadian ice hockey goaltender
 Jean-Sébastien Bérubé (born 1978), Canadian cartoonist, designer of the Radisson comics
Jessica Bérubé (born 1992), Canadian baseball pitcher
Jocelyn Bérubé (born 1946), Canadian actor, musician and storyteller
Joseph Bérubé, Ombudsman of the province of New Brunswick, Canada
Léo Bérubé (1884–1967), Canadian lawyer and politician
Liz Berube (born 1943), American comic book artist
 Michael Bérubé (born 1961), American professor and author
Michelle Berube (born 1966), American actress and Olympic gymnast
 Pascal Bérubé (born 1975), Canadian politician
 Philippe Berubé (born 1983), Canadian snowboarder
 Raphaël Bérubé, Canadian rapper known as Sir Pathétik
Roger Berube (born 1938), American politician
 Ryan Berube (born 1973), American swimmer
Sandrine Bérubé (born 1999), Canadian wheelchair basketball player
 Yves Bérubé (1940–1993), Québécois engineer and politician

See also
Berube Lake in northeastern Ontario, Canada

Surnames of Norman origin